During the 1947–48 English football season, Brentford competed in the Football League Second Division. In the Bees' first second-tier season since 1934–35, the club slumped to a 15th-place finish.

Season summary 

After relegation to the Second Division at the end of the 1946–47 season, Brentford were forced to cash in on their assets and received £16,000 from the sales of George Smith and Scotland international Archie Macaulay. No less than 14 players departed Griffin Park during the off-season, with five players coming in at a cost of nearly £20,000 – half back David Nelson and forwards Peter Buchanan, Tommy Dawson, Tommy Dougall and Jackie Gibbons, with Gibbons rejoining the club after making 11 appearances while an amateur during the 1938–39 season. After a poor start to the season, Jimmy Hogan was brought in as a coach. It would be long-serving trainer Bob Kane's final season with the club.

Brentford had an awful start to the season, winning one and losing eight of the opening 9 matches to leave the club rooted to the bottom of the table. Bit-part half back Cyril Toulouse was transferred to Tottenham Hotspur in exchange for Jack Chisholm, who lead the team's recovery from the centre of the field. Just three defeats in 13 matches between late-September and mid-December 1946 finally lifted the club out of the relegation places. More players would come and go in the second half of the season – Tony Harper and Fred Monk came in from non-league football, with Percy Gleeson, George Stewart and Arthur Shaw transferring out. 

Brentford finished a tumultuous season in 15th place, 11 points above the relegation zone, having lost just four of the final 20 matches of the league campaign. The season ended with an irksome 1–0 defeat to local rivals (and Second Division champions) Queens Park Rangers in the Ealing Hospital Cup final. The club record for fewest goalscorers in a season was equalled, with just eight players finding the net.

League table

Results
Brentford's goal tally listed first.

Legend

Football League Second Division

FA Cup

 Sources: Statto, 11v11, 100 Years Of Brentford

Playing squad 
Players' ages are as of the opening day of the 1947–48 season.

 Sources: 100 Years of Brentford, Timeless Bees

Coaching staff

Statistics

Appearances and goals

Players listed in italics left the club mid-season.
Source: 100 Years Of Brentford

Goalscorers 

Players listed in italics left the club mid-season.
Source: 100 Years Of Brentford

Management

Summary

Transfers & loans 
Cricketers are not included in this list.

References 

Brentford F.C. seasons
Brentford